Chorivalva unisaccula is a moth of the family Gelechiidae. It is found in Korea and the Russian Far East.

The wingspan is 11-13.5 mm. Adults are similar to Chorivalva grandialata. The forewings are whitish brown, speckled with dark brown scales. The hindwings are grey.

References

Moths described in 1988
Litini